Jesolo or Iesolo is a seaside resort town and comune in the Metropolitan City of Venice, Italy of 26,447 inhabitants.
With around six million visitors per year, Jesolo is one of the largest beach resorts in the country, and ranks 7th overall as a tourist destination, and fourth (behind Rimini, Cavallino-Treporti, San Michele al Tagliamento/Bibione) most popular Italian seaside resort. With 204,711.4 visits per thousand inhabitants, it is also one of the 50 Italian towns with the greatest tourist pressure.
Its 15 kilometre long beaches and proximity to central Europe make it a favourite destination of many German, Austrian, Dutch and French visitors.

Geography
The town lies north of Venice, between Eraclea and Cavallino-Treporti. The urbanized area lies on an island of sorts, delimited by the rivers Piave (on the east) and Sile (on the west), and an artificial canal called Cavetta, which starts from the center of Jesolo and goes towards Cortellazzo.

The Jesolo area stretches along the Venetian coast on a flat landscape overlooking the Adriatic Sea and edged by Jesolo’s own lagoon (22 km), and by the rivers Sile and Po. This latter is edged by the opposite Laguna del Mort. The valley of Dragojesolo together with that of Grassabò, is the largest in the northern lagoon of Venice. The coastal strip is low and sandy, consisting of an uninterrupted beach about 12 kilometres long and varying in thickness between 30 and 100 metres.

History
In Roman times the lagoon extended over the area now occupied by the town. It is thought that Jesolo represents a corruption of this name.

Origin of the name 
The ancient name of Jesolo was Equilium (from the Latin equos or from Venetian ekvo) which means "town of horses". The name refers to the breeding of horses, for which the ancient Venetians were famous. The current name of Jesolo probably comes from a series of transcription errors of the oldest name (Equilo, Esulo, Lesulo, Jexulo, Jexollo, Jesolum, Giesolo). From the 16th century until 1930, Jesolo was called Cavazzuccherina. This name came from the canal of the same name (in Venetian Cava), opened on 20 April and built by Alvise Zucharin (Zuccherina).

The official spelling used by the municipality is Jesolo but in the same time, the spelling Iesolo is also erroneously used. The use of "J" here is a rare example of a retained archaism, as the letter does not exist in the modern standard Italian alphabet, except in loanwords and proper names.

Economy
The city's economy is mostly based on tourism. Jesolo is a seaside resort with abundant holiday facilities and its  beach called Lido di Jesolo. At the height of its touristic life, Jesolo was hosting 6.5 million tourists per year. Currently these have dropped to around 5.5-6 million tourists per year due to the competition from new resort towns. In 2020, because of the covid 19 pandemic, Jesolo has registered around 3.5 million nights, ranking second among Italian beaches overall.

People
 Petrus de Natalibus (d. circa 1400), bishop of Equilio from 1370 to his death, and author who compiled the widely circulated book Legends of the Saints.
 Matteo Momentè (b. 1987), Italian footballer who had played for Inter Milan in the early 2000s but now plays for Pistoiese.
 Dragan Cigan (1975-2007), Bosnian construction worker and a nonswimmer who jumped into a whirlpool to save two children from drowning before drowning himself. For his sacrifice he was awarded Gold Medal for Civil Valor and a street in Jesolo was named after him.

Sport
The local football team, A.C. Jesolo, is based at the Stadio Armando Picchi and plays in the Prima Categoria Veneto group G.

Jesolo hosts the City of Jesolo Trophy, an international gymnastics competition.

Twin towns
 Velden am Wörther See, Austria, since 2006

Gallery

Notes and references

External links

Webcam  from Jesolo Tourism Association.

Cities and towns in Veneto

Category:Lists of municipalities of Italy